XHHPR-FM is a radio station on 101.7 FM in Parral, Chihuahua, Mexico. It is owned by Multimedios Radio and carries its La Lupe variety hits format. The XHHPR-FM transmitter is located on Cerro Cuesta de los López.

History
XHHPR received its concession on March 14, 1997. It has always been owned by Multimedios.

In August 2017, XHHPR and XHEAT-FM swapped formats, with XHHPR becoming the La Caliente station. XHEAT-FM closed down in early 2019.

Multimedios flipped XHHPR in June 2020 to its La Lupe Spanish adult hits format.

References

Radio stations in Chihuahua
Multimedios Radio
Spanish-language radio stations